Robert Harland Reifsnyder (born June 18, 1937) is a retired American football player. An All-American at the United States Naval Academy, he won the Maxwell Award in 1957.  He went on to play professionally for the American Football League's New York Titans (1960–1961).  Reifsnyder was inducted into the College Football Hall of Fame in 1997. He has also coached high school football. He coached the Bisons of Alfred G. Berner High School in Massapequa, New York, where actor Alec Baldwin was one of his players.  He won the "Thorp Award" (Nassau County NY Outstanding HS Football Player) in 1954; joining fellow "Thorp Award" winners:  Jim Brown-1952, John Mackey-1958 and Matt Snell-1959.

See also

 List of American Football League players

References

1937 births
Living people
American football defensive ends
American football tackles
New York Titans (AFL) players
Navy Midshipmen football players
College Football Hall of Fame inductees
Maxwell Award winners
Sportspeople from Brooklyn
Players of American football from New York City
People from Baldwin, Nassau County, New York